Azim Hashim Premji (born 24 July 1945) is an Indian businessman and philanthropist, who was the chairman of Wipro Limited. Premji remains a non-executive member of the board and founder chairman. He is informally known as the Czar of the Indian IT Industry. He was responsible for guiding Wipro through four decades of diversification and growth, to finally emerge as one of the global leaders in the software industry. In 2010, he was voted among the 20 most powerful men in the world by Asiaweek. He has twice been listed among the 100 most influential people by Time magazine, once in 2004 and more recently in 2011. For years, he has been regularly listed one among The 500 Most Influential Muslims. He also serves as the Chancellor of Azim Premji University, Bangalore. Permji is awarded Padma Vibhushan, India's second highest civilian award, by the Government of India.

According to the Forbes and Bloomberg Billionaires Index, Premji's net worth is estimated at $9.3 billion and $25 billion, respectively, as of February 2023. In 2013, he agreed to give away at least half of his wealth by signing the Giving Pledge. Premji started with a $2.2 billion donation to the Azim Premji Foundation, focused on education in India. He topped the EdelGive Hurun India Philanthropy List for 2020. In 2019, he dropped from the 2nd position in the Forbes India Rich list to 17th position after giving away a huge amount to charity.

Early life and education
Premji was born in Bombay, India in an Indian Muslim family. His father was a noted businessman and was known as Rice King of Burma. Muhammad Ali Jinnah, founder of Pakistan, invited his father Muhammed Hashim Premji to come to Pakistan, he turned down the request and chose to remain in India.

Premji has a Bachelor of Science in Electrical Engineering degree from Stanford University. He is married to Yasmeen Premji. The couple have two children, Rishad and Tariq. Rishad Premji is currently the chief strategy officer of IT business, Wipro.

Career
In 1945, Muhammed Hashim Premji incorporated Western Indian Vegetable Products Ltd, based at Amalner, a small town in the Jalgaon district of Maharashtra. It used to manufacture cooking oil under the brand name Sunflower Vanaspati, and a laundry soap called 787, a byproduct of oil manufacture. In 1966, on the news of his father's death, the then 21-year-old Azim Premji returned home from Stanford University, where he was studying engineering, to take charge of Wipro. The company, which was called Western Indian Vegetable Products at the time, dealt in hydrogenated oil manufacturing but Azim Premji later diversified the company to bakery fats, ethnic ingredient based toiletries, hair care soaps, baby toiletries, lighting products, and hydraulic cylinders. In the 1980s, the young entrepreneur, recognising the importance of the emerging IT field, took advantage of the vacuum left behind by the expulsion of IBM from India, changed the company name to Wipro and entered the high-technology sector by manufacturing minicomputers in technological collaboration with an American company Sentinel Computer Corporation. Thereafter, Premji made a focused shift from soaps to software.

Recognition
 Premji has been recognised by Business Week as one of the "Greatest Entrepreneurs" for being responsible for Wipro emerging as one of the world's fastest growing companies.
 In 2000, he was conferred an honorary doctorate by the Manipal Academy of Higher Education. In 2006, Azim Premji was awarded Lakshya Business Visionary by National Institute of Industrial Engineering, Mumbai. 
 In 2005, the Government of India honoured him with the title of Padma Bhushan for his outstanding work in trade and commerce.
 In 2009, he was awarded an honorary doctorate from Wesleyan University in Middletown, Connecticut for his outstanding philanthropic work. In 2015, Mysore University conferred an honorary doctorate on him.
 In 2011, he has been awarded Padma Vibhushan, the second-highest civilian award by the Government of India.
 In April 2017, India Today magazine ranked him 9th in India's 50 Most powerful people of 2017 list.
 In 2018, Premji was conferred with Chevalier de la Légion d'Honneur (Knight of the Legion of Honour) – the highest French civilian distinction by the French Government.
 In December 2019, Premji was cited by Forbes magazine as one of the "Heroes of Philanthropy list of 30 altruists" in the Asia-Pacific region.
 In 2019, Forbes put Premji in the list of the world's most generous philanthropists outside of the US.

Philanthropy

Azim Premji Foundation
 In 2001, he founded Azim Premji Foundation, a non-profit organization.
 In December 2010, he pledged to donate US$2 billion for improving school education in India. This has been done by transferring 213 million equity shares of Wipro Ltd, held by a few entities controlled by him, to the Azim Premji Trust. This donation is the largest of its kind in India. In March 2019, Premji pledged an additional 34% of Wipro stock held by him to the foundation. At a current value of about US$7.5 billion, this allocation will bring the total endowment from him to the foundation to US$21 billion.
 In May 2020, the Azim Premji Foundation collaborated with the National Centre for Biological Sciences, and the Institute for Stem Cell Science and Regenerative Medicine for augmenting testing infrastructure to deal with the coronavirus pandemic.
 The foundation has warned against scam emails which claim to be from the foundation and falsely request donations.

The Giving Pledge
Premji has said that being rich "did not thrill" him. He became the first Indian to sign up for the Giving Pledge, a campaign led by Warren Buffett and Bill Gates, to encourage the wealthiest people to make a commitment to give most of their wealth to philanthropic causes. He is the third non-American after Richard Branson and David Sainsbury to join this club.

In April 2013 he said that he has already given more than 25 per cent of his personal wealth to charity.

In July 2015, he gave away an additional 18% of his stake in Wipro, taking his total contribution so far to 39%.

The first Indian to sign the Giving Pledge, his lifetime giving now stands at US$21 billion. In April 2019, Azim Premji became the top Indian philanthropist.

EdelGive Hurun India Philanthropy List 
Azim Premji topped the list of "India's most generous" released by Hurun India and EdelGive on 10 November 2020. He donated ₹79.04 billion in financial year 2019–20 which is a 17-fold jump from the ₹4.53 billion donated in FY19. Education is the primary cause for his donations. He retained his position in FY21 by donating ₹9,713 crore (US$1.33 billion).

See also
 List of billionaires

References

External links

 Profile at Wipro 
   
 
 
 Profile at Forbes
 Profile at Bloomberg L.P.  
 
 

1945 births
Living people 
Giving Pledgers
21st-century philanthropists
21st-century businesspeople 
20th-century Indian businesspeople 
Indian billionaires
Indian Muslims 
Indian Ismailis
Indian company founders
Businesspeople in software 
Businesspeople from Bangalore
Businesspeople from Mumbai 
Recipients of the Padma Bhushan in trade and industry
Recipients of the Padma Vibhushan in trade & industry 
Stanford University alumni
Wesleyan University people
Wipro
Indian philanthropists
Founders of Indian schools and colleges
Indian industrialists
Indian venture capitalists